"Uncover" is a song by Swedish singer Zara Larsson from her debut extended play, Introducing (2013). The song was released on 21 January 2013. It was written by Marcus Sepehrmanesh, Robert Habolin and Gavin Jones and it was produced by Habolin. It initially charted on DigiListan charts, SR P3 charts for downloads on 27 January 2013 and eventually charted on Sverigetopplistan, the official Swedish Singles Chart on 22 February 2013 becoming number one. The single also charted in Norway reaching number one as well. In July 2013, the song was certified 6× Platinum in Sweden by Universal Music Sweden.

"Uncover" was also featured on Larsson's Scandinavian debut studio album, 1 (2014, as a newer recording from 2014), and her international debut extended play, Uncover (2015).

Charts

Weekly charts

Year-end charts

Certifications

Release history

References

2013 songs
2013 singles
Zara Larsson songs
Epic Records singles
Number-one singles in Sweden
Number-one singles in Norway
Songs written by Robert Habolin
Songs written by Marcus Sepehrmanesh